Hemant Brijwasi, nicknamed, 'Hemu'  is an Indian singer. In 2009, at age 11, he won the television contest for Sa Re Ga Ma Pa L'il Champs. In 2018, at age 20, he won the television contest Rising Star 2. He has performed as a playback singer for films Soorma (2018) and Manikarnika: The Queen of Jhansi (2019).

References 

Year of birth missing (living people)
Living people
21st-century Indian male singers
21st-century Indian singers
1990s births